The 1997–98 Segunda Divisão season was the 64th season of the competition and the 48th season of recognised third-tier football in Portugal.

Overview
The league was contested by 54 teams in 3 divisions with Naval 1º Maio, AD Esposende and CD Santa Clara winning the respective divisional competitions and gaining promotion to the Liga de Honra.  The overall championship was won by CD Santa Clara.

League standings

Segunda Divisão – Zona Norte

Segunda Divisão – Zona Centro

Segunda Divisão – Zona Sul

Footnotes

External links
 Portuguese Division Two «B» – footballzz.co.uk

Portuguese Third Division seasons
Port
3